Kirker Butler is an American writer, who has written and produced shows such as  Family Guy,  The Cleveland Show, The Neighbors (2012 TV series), Galavant, and Life in Pieces.

Career
Butler joined Family Guy in 2004, and has since produced and written multiple episodes, including:
"Padre de Familia"
"Barely Legal"
"Hell Comes to Quahog"
"The Courtship of Stewie's Father" and The Empire Strikes Back parody 
"Something, Something, Something, Dark Side".

He has been nominated for 2 Emmy Awards for his work on "Family Guy" and "The Cleveland Show".

He is the author of the novel Pretty Ugly and the graphic novel "Blue Agave and Worm." (2010 Viper Comics).

In 2020, he was added to the Barn Theatre, Michigan's wall of fame, having studied at the school in 1993 and 1994.

References

External links

 www.kirkerbutler.com
 Pretty Ugly on Amazon
 Blue Agave and Worm website

American television writers
American male television writers
People from Hartford, Kentucky
Year of birth missing (living people)
American television producers
Living people
Screenwriters from Kentucky